The Girl from Beskydy Mountains is a 1944 Czech drama film directed by František Čáp based on a novel by Miloslav J. Sousedík.

Production
The film was shot in Beskydy Mountains. People of Hážovice, Tylovice and Rožnov pod Radhoštěm lent the actors folk costumes and accessories.

Cast
 Jaroslav Vojta as dřevař Vavruš Cagala
 Marie Nademlejnská as Filoména, Cagala's wife
 Terezie Brzková as Grandmother Cagalová
 Marie Glázrová as Terezka, Cagala's daughter
 Vladimír Salač as Ondra, Cagala's son
 Otomar Korbelář as dřevař Cyril Hanulík
 Jiřina Štěpničková as Heva, Hanulík's wife
 Gustav Nezval as Tomáš, son of Cyril
 Gustav Hilmar as Landowner Zgabaj
 Jiří Dohnal as Pavel, Zgabaj's son
 František Kreuzmann as Landowner Vincek Kapralík
 Vítězslav Vejražka as Francek, Vincek's brother

References

External links 
 

1944 drama films
Films directed by František Čáp
1944 films
Czech drama films
1940s Czech-language films
Czech black-and-white films
1940s Czech films